Bodil Margrethe Thirstedt-Svendsen (born 4 November 1916; date of death unknown) was a Danish sprint canoeist who competed from the late 1930s to the early 1950s. She won three medals at the ICF Canoe Sprint World Championships with a gold (K-2 500 m: 1948) and two bronzes (K-1 600 m, K-2 600 m: both 1938).

Svendsen also competed in the K-1 500 m event at the 1952 Summer Olympics in Helsinki, but was eliminated in the heats. Her husband, Axel Svendsen, also competed in the canoeing events at the 1936 Summer Olympics.

References
  "THIRSTED Bodil (DEN)"
 
 

1916 births
Year of death missing
Canoeists at the 1952 Summer Olympics
Danish female canoeists
Olympic canoeists of Denmark
ICF Canoe Sprint World Championships medalists in kayak